This is a list of major bridges in Hobart, Tasmania, Australia:

Bowen Bridge
Bridgewater Bridge (Tasmania, Australia)
Hobart Bridge
Jordan River Bridge
Mcgees Bridge
Sorell Causeway
Tasman Bridge

See also 
List of bridges in Australia

Hobart bridges
Hobart bridges
Hobart
Bridges